Charles Crow or Charles Crowe could refer to: 

Charles Crow (died 1726), Irish Episcopalian bishop 
Charles A. Crow (1873–1938), American politician
Charlie Crow, Canadian disc jockey and politician
Charles Crowe (1867–1953), Canadian sport shooter
Charlie Crowe (1924–2010), English footballer